The Convent of Jesus and Mary ("CJM") is a network of Roman Catholic schools founded by the Congregation of the Religious of Jesus and Mary. The school network originating in east-central France in the 19th century has since its inception expanded to several countries spread across Europe, Asia, Africa, North and South America. CJM schools are present in the following countries: In Europe: Ireland, Spain, Italy, England, and Germany. In the Americas: United States, Canada, Mexico, Colombia, and Bolivia. In the Middle East: Lebanon and Syria. In Africa: Cameroon, Equatorial Guinea, Gabon, and Nigeria. In Asia: India, Pakistan, and the Philippines.

History 
Claudine Thévenet (1774–1837) (known as Mary of St. Ignatius) founded the religious institute  of the Religious of Jesus and Mary, a Roman Catholic religious congregation of women dedicated to the education and service of the poor in Lyon, France, on 5 October 1818.

School Network 

Some of the current CJM schools include (in alphabetical order):

India:
 Convent of Jesus and Mary, Ambala
 Convent of Jesus and Mary, Agra Cantt
 Convent of Jesus and Mary, Baroda
 College of Jesus and Mary, Cordoba
 Convent of Jesus and Mary, Delhi
 Convent of Jesus and Mary, Dehradun
 St. Agnes' High School, Byculla, Mumbai
 Convent of Jesus and Mary, Kharghar navi mumbai
 Convent of Jesus and Mary, Mumbai (Fort Convent, Mumbai)
 St. Anne’s High School, Fort, Mumbai
 Convent of Jesus and Mary, Waverley, Mussoorie
 Convent of Jesus and Mary, Hampton Court, Mussoorie 
 Convent of Jesus and Mary, Pune - St.Felix, St. Anne's, St.Joseph
 Convent of Jesus and Mary, Ranaghat
 Convent of Jesus and Mary, Shimla
Colleges :
Jesus and Mary College New Delhi 
 St. Bede's College, Shimla

Ireland:

 Salerno Secondary School, Salthill, Galway, Ireland
 Convent of Jesus and Mary, Enniscrone, Co. Sligo
 Convent of Jesus and Mary, Gortnor Abbey, Co. Mayo

Lebanon:

  Convent of Jesus and Mary, Rabweh, Lebanon 

Pakistan:
 Convent of Jesus and Mary, Sialkot (established: 1856)
 Convent of Jesus and Mary, Murree (established: 1876)
 Convent of Jesus and Mary, Lahore (established: 1876)
 Convent of Jesus and Mary, Karachi (established: 1957)
 Convent of Jesus and Mary, Islamabad (established: 1979)
 Convent of Jesus and Mary, Mariakhel, Mianwali (established: 1956)
 Convent of Jesus and Mary, Toba Tek Singh (established: 1999)

United Kingdom:
 Convent of Jesus and Mary, Thornton College, Thornton, Buckingham
 Convent of Jesus and Mary Language College, London

References

Girls' schools in France
Catholic schools in India
Catholic schools in the United Kingdom
Roman Catholic schools in the Republic of Ireland
Catholic schools in Pakistan
Schools in Lebanon